Minotauro Records is a small independent record label based in Pavia, Italy.  Started in the early 80s by producer Marco Melzi, the label played a pivotal role in the early underground Italian heavy metal scene, releasing some of the most ground-breaking and genre-defining albums by Italian artists Paul Chain, Strana Officina, Death SS, Vanexa, and many others.

The label has experienced a revival in recent years, releasing albums by bands from all over the world, including Tactics, Devil Childe, The Fury, Phantom Lord, Jack Starr's Burning Starr, Bootlegs, Defyance, Super Massive Black Holes, Ogre, Craving Angel, Misantropus, Antonello Giliberto, Seth, Zero Down, Uncle Sam, among many others.

Italian independent record labels